Sara Samir Elsayed Mohamed Ahmed (born 1 January 1998) is an Egyptian weightlifter who won a bronze medal in the women's 69 kg event at the 2016 Summer Olympics in Rio de Janeiro, Brazil. She won the gold medal in the women's 76kg event at the 2022 World Weightlifting Championships held in Bogotá, Colombia. Originally from the Ismailia Governorate, Ahmed was encouraged to take part in weightlifting by her family and was competing internationally by 2012. At the senior level, she has earned gold medals at the Mediterranean and African Games, as well as the Arab Championships. In Rio de Janeiro, she became the first Arab woman to receive an Olympic weightlifting medal and the first Egyptian woman to receive an Olympic medal on the podium in any discipline.

Early life
Ahmed was born in the village of Al-Huaniya in Egypt's Ismailia Governorate. Her father (who died in 2015) and older brother were national competitors in weightlifting, which inspired her to take up the sport in 2010. Although her participation in the sport interfered with her studies somewhat, she received encouragement and support for her family and found success in local and regional tournaments, eventually earning herself a spot on the Egyptian national team.

Career
Ahmed's international career began at the 2012 Junior African Championships in Tunis, where she won gold in the 63 kg division. She repeated that feat at the Youth edition, held in the same city, as well as the 2013 Youth World Championships in Tashkent. Her first senior-level competition was the 2013 Mediterranean Games, where she won the clean & jerk portion and was third in the snatch, leaving her second overall behind Turkey's Sibel Şimşek (Romela Begaj of Albania had the same total, but a higher body weight). She then bumped up to the 69 kg division and won that category at the 2014 African Youth and Junior Championships, then returned to 63 kg and earned gold at the 2014 Summer Youth Olympics. She competed one last time in the 63 kg division at the 2014 World Championships in Almaty, where she placed 12th, and then returned to 69 kg and captured gold at the 2015 African Games and Youth and Junior World Championships; at the latter she was named the Best Female Lifter. She placed fourth at the 2015 World Championships in Houston and took home gold at that year's Arab Championships held in Sharm el-Sheikh.

Ahmed represented Egypt at the 2016 Summer Olympics in the women's 69 kg event, skipping her high school exams in order to compete. To prepare for the Games, she attended training camps in Uzbekistan, the United Arab Emirates, and Brazil. In Rio she won a bronze medal, lifting a combined weight of 255 kg. She thus became the first Arab woman to win an Olympic weightlifting medal and the first Egyptian woman to win an Olympic medal, although Abeer Abdelrahman retroactively received a silver medal from the women's 75 kg weightlifting event at the 2012 Summer Olympics, as all three medalists in that event tested positive for banned substances and she was upgraded from fifth to third after the Games. Ahmed was also the first Egyptian to win a weightlifting medal since 1948, with the caveat that Abdelrahman and Tarek Yehia retroactively received medals from the London Games. Later in the day, Mohamed Ihab joined her in this distinction by taking bronze in the men's 77 kg.

Upon her return she was honored in a ceremony held by Ismailia governor Yassin Taher, received congratulatory messages from Egyptian president Abdel Fattah el-Sisi, and was given 500,000 Egyptian pounds. Soon after receiving the medal, she declared her intention to train for gold at the 2020 Summer Olympics. Following her victory, she encouraged the Egyptian government to do more to support its athletes, including granting more leniency for athletes in terms of taking college-preparatory exams. She has no special nutritional routine and is coached by the national team's Khaled Korany.

Ahmed won gold in both portions of the 69 kg division at the 2018 Mediterranean Games. The following month, at the 2018 Junior World Weightlifting Championships in Tashkent, Uzbekistan, she won all three categories of the 69 kg tournament. At the senior edition that year, she was third in the snatch and second in the clean and jerk, which placed her second overall in the 71 kg division. She is engaged to another Egyptian Olympic weightlifter, Ragab Abdelhay.

Major results

See also
Muslim women in sport

References

External links
 
 
 

1998 births
Living people
Egyptian female weightlifters
Olympic weightlifters of Egypt
Olympic bronze medalists for Egypt
Olympic medalists in weightlifting
Medalists at the 2016 Summer Olympics
Weightlifters at the 2016 Summer Olympics
People from Ismailia Governorate
Weightlifters at the 2014 Summer Youth Olympics
Mediterranean Games gold medalists for Egypt
Mediterranean Games silver medalists for Egypt
Mediterranean Games bronze medalists for Egypt
Competitors at the 2013 Mediterranean Games
African Games gold medalists for Egypt
African Games medalists in weightlifting
World Weightlifting Championships medalists
Mediterranean Games medalists in weightlifting
Competitors at the 2015 African Games
Youth Olympic gold medalists for Egypt
21st-century Egyptian women